A self timer is a device on a camera that gives a delay between pressing the shutter release and the shutter's firing. It is most commonly used to let the photographer to take a photo of themselves (often with a group of other people), hence the name.

The self-timer is also used to reduce camera shake when taking photographs in low light or with long (telephoto) lenses. The timer's delay gives the photographer time to steady the camera before the shutter fires, and allows vibrations from the mirror flipping up (on SLRs) to die out. It also eliminates any photographer-induced camera motion when the shutter button is pressed.

Most modern cameras with a self-timer flash a light during the countdown, emit a beeping sound, or both. These warnings generally increase in speed or intensity during the last few seconds, to warn that the shutter is about to fire.

The most common delay is ten seconds. Some cameras also have a two-second and five-second settings. A few cameras provide continuously variable 
delay.

Single-lens reflex cameras have to flip up the viewing mirror before the picture is taken, which can also shake the camera. It is not uncommon for a camera to combine mirror lockup with the two-second self-timer mode, which reduces camera shake still further.

Alternatives to the self-timer include a cable release, and infrared or radio remote control.

On some leaf-shutter cameras, the self-timer mode is selected with the flash-sync lever, and is marked V, for the German word Vorlaufwerk.

See also
Bulb (photography)
Intervalometer
Long-exposure photography

External Links

 Faries Manufacturing Company: Autopoze - An Early Self-timer

Camera features
Timers
Selfies